Phase3 Telecom is an aerial fiber optic network infrastructure provider, providing connectivity, network management and data storage services to wholesale, enterprise and retail customers across West Africa.The company was incorporated in 2003 and is headquartered in Abuja, Nigeria. Licensed by the Nigerian Communications Commission in 2006 - the company in 2014 and 2018, added more kilometers to its existing coverage area with footprint expansion of its MPLS network and fixed broadband services. The company has been vital to growth in Africa's growing ICT market, implementing the Wire Nigeria Project—conceived by the Nigerian Communications Commission to help provide broadband communications access to rural communities. Phase3 has a broad range of wholesale and enterprise clients including Glo, MTN, 9Mobile, Ntel, Airtel, Smile Communications, World Bank, Julius Berger, Unity Bank e.t.c. Some of the African countries where the company currently has partner operations include Nigeria, Benin, Togo and Republic of Niger.

History 

Phase3 was licensed in 2003, as a national long distance operator and in 2006 entered into a major strategic Public–private partnershipto access national power grid lines to carry traffic for telecommunication operators. Phase3 and Alheri Engineering were the two firms that beat 7 companies, including Siemens Nigeria, Suburban Telecom, NTL, Optic Networks Limited and Backbone Company of Nigeria; to secure the deal. Such an access to a telecommunications enabled infrastructure was to make it possible for both companies (with Phase3 planned layout pegged for Nigeria's north and Alheri Engineering's for west) to build out reliable fiber-optic backbone networks, to ensure faster broadband penetration and nationwide connectivity in the Nigeria unserved and under-served communities. Thus, making it possible for mobile operators, internet service providers, businesses, government agencies and international organisations to take advantage of the huge bandwidth that is centrally managed. And, in March 2006, Phase3 finalized a 15 Years Agreement for the Design, Build, Finance, Operate (DBFO) Telecommunications Infrastructure model for the Western part of Nigeria". This largely positioned Phase3 for expansive growth; the operational viability to run layered range of telecoms, and valued-added services as well as considerable access to foreign investment. More so, the company's capacity to offer non-discriminatory and non-competitive services to mobile operators became its distinctive factor as an open access network with unique right of way (RoW).

Regional connectivity

2009–2011 

In 2009, Phase3 investments cull in the Nigerian telecommunications space hit US$100 million with fiber optic building projects centering on transmission services. Further expansion saw the commencement of the US$200 million cross-country optic fiber coverage project for carrier-grade international voice services to PSTN, GSM, and Pan-European calling card operators, as well as Tier 1 traffic Carriers to interconnect' riding on their international connectivity through SAT3 in Lagos, where a Gateway provides a link to their POP in London, thus giving it connectivity with over 370 carriers. In September of that year, the company signed an exclusive right of way Concession Agreement with the Communautéé Electrique du Benin (CEB), the authority responsible for the operation of High Voltage Power lines in both Benin and Togo Republics; a development that gained them the longest regional terrestrial fiber network linking Nigeria to the Republic of Benin and Togo, with potentials for connections to Ghana and Burkina Faso from Togo; making them about the first regional fiber optic cable network provider in West Africa to operate national fiber optic cable backbone interconnecting six (6) West African countries.

2013–2015 
In March 2015, Phase3 Telecom announced that it would be deploying aerial fiber optic infrastructure from Kano in Nigeria to Gazaoua in the Republic of Niger on a project facilitated by the Universal Service Provision Fund (USPF) through the extension of the Backbone Transmission Infrastructure Program (BTRAIN) programme to Niger under the authorization of Ministry of Communication Technology for the Federal Republic of Nigeria to deliver key infrastructure to connect the neighbours to the rest of the world and establish strong and sustainable partnerships across the sub-region. The network will be 228 km long and will give Niger the opportunity to leverage on the bandwidth capacity available at the Nigerian coast, through Phase3 telecom's aerial fiber network which is critical to the acceleration of sustainable socio-economic inclusion and growth for the Republic of Niger.  Niger is a landlocked country that borders seven countries, namely Algeria, Republic of Benin, Burkina Faso, Chad, Libya, Mali, and Nigeria. The lack of backbone infrastructure between the Republic of Niger and its neighbours leaves Niger unable to take full advantage of broadband. With one of the lowest internet penetration rates in West Africa at 1.7% in 2013, Niger will have the opportunity to use the large bandwidth capacity which is available at the Nigerian coast in Lagos through the Phase3 telecom aerial fibre network. This will also widen the market for under-sea cable owners in Nigeria thus enhancing the objectives of the Nigeria - Niger Joint Commission (NNJC) and the partnership between the two countries.

2016–2019 
In 2016, Phase3 commenced the first phase of network modifications with audit, maintenance, restoration and upgrade activities carried out across the northern ring of the network - scoped for an 18 month implementation period. This it claims, will make the network more next-generation service capable for anticipated layered service scenarios that will come with it. The next phase took off in May, 2019 as the company began to explore strategic Pan-Africa and international partnerships on digital infrastructure for a budding digital services ecosystem in Nigeria. With planned investments in evolving telecommunications technology including the FSOC model

Global partnerships 
In continuum of its network expansion map, Phase3 went into partnership with PCCW Global (the Hong Kong-headquartered international operating division of HKT, Hong Kong's premier telecom service provider) for regional connectivity provisioning that allow network access for businesses in multiple locations across West Africa

References

Further reading
 http://www.balancingact-africa.com/news/en/issue-no-298/internet/nigeria-s-phase3-win/en
 http://www.itnewsafrica.com/2014/03/nigerias-phase3-telecom-inks-deal-with-hong-kong-telecom/
 http://www.biztechafrica.com/article/phase3-telecom-upgrades-adam-smiths-facility/8815/

Telecommunications companies of Nigeria